Renegades of Sonora is a 1948 American Western film directed by R. G. Springsteen and written by M. Coates Webster. The film stars Allan Lane, Eddy Waller, Roy Barcroft, Frank Fenton, Mauritz Hugo and George J. Lewis. The film was released on November 24, 1948 by Republic Pictures.

Plot

Cast    
Allan Lane as Rocky Lane
Black Jack as Black Jack
Eddy Waller as Nugget Clark
Roy Barcroft as George Keeler
Frank Fenton as Sheriff Jim Crawford
Mauritz Hugo as Henchman Pete Lasker
George J. Lewis as Chief Eagle Claw
Mike Ragan as Henchman 
Dale Van Sickel as Brad 
Marshall Reed as Deputy
House Peters, Jr. as Courier

References

External links 
 

1948 films
American Western (genre) films
1948 Western (genre) films
Republic Pictures films
Films directed by R. G. Springsteen
American black-and-white films
1940s English-language films
1940s American films